A local election was held in the Mexican state of Guanajuato on Sunday, July 2, 2006. Voters went to the polls to elect, on the local level:

A new Governor of Guanajuato to serve for a six-year term.
46 municipal presidents (mayors) to serve for a three-year term.
36 local deputies (22 by the first-past-the-post system and 14 by proportional representation) to serve for a three-year term in the Congress of Guanajuato.

Gubernatorial Election
Eight political parties participated in the 2006 Guanajuato state election.

External links
Electoral Institute of Guanajuato website

Guanajuato
Election